IVC can refer to:

Places
Invercargill Airport, New Zealand, IATA code
Ivory Coast, UNDP country code
Oflag IV-C, a German World War II prisoner-of-war camp in Colditz Castle

Education
Impington Village College
Irvine Valley College
Imperial Valley College

Medicine and biology 
Involuntary commitment
Inferior vena cava
Inferior vena cava filter
Intravenous Vitamin C
In vitro compartmentalization

Music 

 International Vocal Competition 's-Hertogenbosch, a competition for opera, oratorio and lied singers

Science and technology 
Indus Valley civilization, a Bronze Age civilization centralized along the Indus River
Internet Video Coding, a "free-of-charge" MPEG video coding standard
Inter-vehicle communication

Other uses
Ignatian Volunteer Corps
International Video Corporation, a manufacturer of videotape recorders in the 1960s and 70s
Individually ventilated cage
Invacare
International Vale Tudo Championship
In-vessel composting

See also

4C (disambiguation) 
C4 (disambiguation)